Vyacheslav Mikhalovich Gaizer, born in 1966, is a Russian politician who served as Head of the Komi Republic from January 2010 to September 2015.

On 19 September 2015, an investigation by Russia's Investigative Committee has led to his arrest. Gayzer and 18 of his associates, some of them also members of the regional administration, have been charged with organizing and running a criminal gang involved in the theft of state property on a mass scale. The charges against him were dropped in March 2017.

References

External links 
 Биография на официальном портале Республики Коми
 Биография на информационном портале «КомиОнлайн»
 Биография на сайте Агентства экономической информации

Living people
1966 births
Heads of the Komi Republic
Heads of the federal subjects of Russia of German descent
People from Inta
Inmates of Lefortovo Prison
Heads of government who were later imprisoned
Moscow State University of Economics, Statistics, and Informatics alumni